Nira is a census town in Pune district in the Indian state of Maharashtra.

Demographics
Males constitute 51% of the population and females 49%. Nira has an average literacy rate of 86%, with male literacy being 91%, and female literacy being 80%. In Nira, 11% of the population is under 6 years of age.

Transport
Nira is linked by railway to Miraj and Kolhapur.

References

Cities and towns in Pune district